Florence Eugenie Bemis (1861?–?) was a late 19th and early 20th century American entomologist and expert in whiteflies.

Scientific career
Bemis worked at Stanford University in the laboratory of entomologist Vernon Lyman Kellogg and in the field collecting specimens and making biological observations. She studied insects of the Aleyrodidae family, which are known as whiteflies and at the time were also called mealy-winged flies for the waxy white secretion that covers their wings. In 1904, she published a long monograph on a subset of these insects, entitled The Aleyrodds, or Mealy-Winged Flies, of California, with References to Other American Species. In it she described 19 new species of whiteflies found in California, together with a catalogue of whitefly species found elsewhere in America. Although she placed them all in the genus Aleyrodes, many of them have since been moved into other whitefly genera, including Aleuropleurocelus, Aleuroparadoxus, Aleurothrixus, Pealius, Tetraleurodes, and Trialeurodes. Her work is credited with greatly advancing knowledge of California species of whiteflies.

The taxonomic genus Bemisia within the family Aleyrodidae, comprising some of the whiteflies, is named in her honor.

Species discovered
Aleyrodes amnicola
Aleyrodes diasemus
Aleyrodes errans: now Tetraleurodes errans
Aleyrodes extraniens
Aleyrodes glacialis: now Trialeurodes glacialis
Aleyrodes hutchingsi: now Trialeurodes hutchingsi
Aleyrodes interrogationis: now Aleurothrixus interrogationis
Aleyrodes iridescens: now Aleuroparadoxus iridescens
Aleyrodes kelloggi: now Pealius kelloggi
Aleyrodes madroni: now Trialeurodes madroni
Aleyrodes maskelli: now Pealius maskelli
Aleyrodes merlini: now Trialeurodes merlini
Aleyrodes nigrans: now Aleuropleurocelus nigrans
Aleyrodes pruinosus
Aleyrodes quaintancei
Aleyrodes stanfordi
Aleyrodes splendens: now Tetraleurodes errans
Aleyrodes tentaculatus: now Trialeurodes tentaculatus
Aleyrodes wellmanae

See also
List of whitefly species

References

American entomologists
20th-century American zoologists
Women entomologists
20th-century American women scientists
19th-century American zoologists
19th-century American women scientists
Stanford University people